Acartophthalmus is a genus of flies, and the only genus with confident placement in the family Acartophthalmidae. Only five species are included.

The biology of Acartophthalmus is almost unknown. The adults have mainly been found in forests, while larvae have been reared from dead wood and decaying organic material.

Species

The five species included in the genus are:

A. bicolor Oldenberg, 1910 — Holarctic
A. coxata (Zetterstedt, 1848) — Europe
A. latrinalis Ozerov, 1986 Russian Far East
A. nigrinus (Zetterstedt, 1848) — Holarctic (common)
A. pusio Frey, 1947 — Europe
Two of the species occur in the United Kingdom.

References

External links

Tree of Life Detailed account with key and images
Fauna Europaea Distribution in West Palaearctic including Russia
Images, Diptera.info
Images representing Acartophthalmidae at Consortium for the Barcode of Life

Carnoidea genera
Acartophthalmidae
Articles containing video clips
Taxa named by Leander Czerny